Anchiphyllia is a genus of moths in the family Geometridae erected by Arthur Gardiner Butler in 1893. It is considered by Luis E. Parra and Carla A. Alvear to be a synonym of Ennada.

Species
 Anchiphyllia olivacena (Butler, 1882)

References

External links

Larentiinae
Geometridae genera